The canton of Saint-Brevin-les-Pins is an administrative division of the Loire-Atlantique department, western France. It was created at the French canton reorganisation which came into effect in March 2015. Its seat is in Saint-Brevin-les-Pins.

It consists of the following communes:
 
Corsept
Frossay
La Montagne
Paimbœuf
Le Pellerin
Saint-Brevin-les-Pins
Saint-Jean-de-Boiseau
Saint-Père-en-Retz
Saint-Viaud

References

Cantons of Loire-Atlantique